Johan Peter Suhr (1712–1785) was a Danish merchant and founder of the trading house J. P. Suhr & Søn. He served as mayor of Copenhagen under Struense. He was the grandfather of Theodor Suhr.

Early life and education
Johan Peter Suhr was born in Købelev Rectory on the island of Lolland, the son of provost of Købelev and Vindeby Bernt Frederik Suhr and his wife Christine Suhr (née Hornemannpriest). He started an apprenticeship in 1728 with flax shopkeeper Oluf Hansen Aagaard on Gammeltorv in Copenhagen.  On 22 November 1748, he married the flax shopkeeper's daughter, Anna Dorthea Aagaard.

Career
Suhr took over the business when his father-in-law died in 1749. He became a member of the Flax Shopkeeper's Guild in 1750. The company thrived and Suhr became a grocer in 1767. He traded in a wide range of products, including tar, linum, hemp, coal, lead and salt. He was also active as a broker and was director of Søe-Assurance Compagniet and a sugar refinery in Store Kongensgade (Interessenters Sukkerhus). He also served as accountant at Det Kongelige Oktroi-erede Handelskompagni. He was also involved in speculative investments in land, iron and grain and owned his own ships. His fortune grew from 7,200 Danish rigsdaler in 1750 to 51,000 rigsdaler in 1760 and had grown to 129,000 rigsdaler in 1770 and 214,000 rigsdaler in 1780.

Suhr had a reputation for being honest, pious and philanthropic. In 1761, he became member of the city council. In 1771, he became Deputy Mayor.

Suhr's son Ole Bernt Suhr (1762–1815) became a partner in the company in 1782. Being the only surviving son among Johan Peter Suhr's eight children, he became sole owner of the family business after his father's death on 28 May 1785.

See also
 J. P. Suhr & Søn

References

External links
 Johan Peter Suhr at geni.com

1712 births
1785 deaths
Danish company founders
Danish merchants
People from Lolland
Johan Peter
Burials at the Church of Our Lady, Copenhagen